The 76 Club was a nightclub in Burton upon Trent, Staffordshire, England.  During the 1970s and 1980s, the club featured appearances by well-known emerging rock bands. In 1976, the Sex Pistols recorded their live album Anarchy in the UK: Live at the 76 Club. Other bands that performed at the club include AC/DC, Dire Straits, Judas Priest, Motörhead, Skid Row, Suzi Quatro, Thin Lizzy, and Ultravox.

History
76 High Street, Burton-on-Trent, began its musical life in the late 1950 when the Mocambo Snack Bar and Café opened to provide refreshment for those walking the long walk from the shopping centre to Wetmore Road bus station (and elsewhere). It soon became popular with the emerging groups of teenagers in the town.

By 1960, local entrepreneur Gordon Band ran three business in the town centre offering food and music: the Harlequin Snack Bar at 21/22 Station Street, the Mocambo Snack Bar and Café at 76 High Street, and the Cambo Club in premises behind the High Street café. On 1 December 1960 the club reopened transformed into the 76 Club, and at some time later in the High Street café became The Jolly Fryer fish and chip shop.

Concerts (selected)

The Revival

Following the success of the 76 Club 50th Anniversary Reunion at Burton upon Trent Town Hall in November 2011, the 76 Club brand 're-formed' the following January 2012, promoting local gigs through its presence on social media, principally Facebook.

References

External links

 

Buildings and structures in Burton upon Trent
Nightclubs in England